The albums discography of Kitty Wells, an American country artist, consists of thirty-six studio albums, eleven compilation albums, and one box set. Wells' first album release was 1956's Country Hit Parade on Decca Records, which compiled her hits during her first four years of recording for the label. Prior to its release, many labels were reluctant to release albums by female country artists until Wells became the first female vocalist to sell records. Following its release, Wells and her label issued three studio albums during the 1950s: Winner of Your Heart (1957), Lonely Street (1958), and Dust on the Bible (1959). After the success of Wells' number one single "Heartbreak U.S.A." in 1961, an album of the same name was released the same year.

In 1963, her fourth compilation album, The Kitty Wells Story, became her first album to chart among the newly created Billboard Magazine Top Country Albums list, peaking at #7. In 1964, her tenth studio album, Especially for You, became her first studio album to chart on the same list, peaking at #19. The latter started a string of albums that would peak on the Billboard country chart during the 1960s, including Burning Memories (#7; 1965), Lonesome, Sad, and Blue (#7; 1965), and Queen of Honky Tonk Street (#5; 1967).

After collaborating with country artist Red Foley on a single, the pair released the album Together Again in 1967. The album reached #24 on the Billboard Country Albums chart. The following year, Wells and her husband Johnnie Wright issued We'll Stick Together, whose title track became a minor hit. The duo also released a gospel album in 1972. In the 1970s, Wells' chart success declined and her albums remained absent from the Billboard lists. Before leaving Decca/MCA, Wells released Yours Truly, her final studio album for the label, in 1973. Wells signed with Capricorn Records in 1975 and released her thirtieth studio album, Forever Young, the same year. In 1979, Wells and her husband formed the label Rubocca Records, and Wells issued her final studio albums in 1979 and 1981 on Rubocca respectively.

Studio albums

1950s

1960s

1970s–1980s

Collaborative albums

Compilation albums

Box sets

References 

Discographies of American artists
Country music discographies